Monolith, the Face of Half Dome, Yosemite National Park, California is a black and white photograph taken by Ansel Adams in 1927 that depicts the western face of Half Dome in Yosemite, California. In the foreground of the photo, viewers are able to see the texture and detail of the rock as well as the background landscape of pine trees and the Tenaya Peak. Monolith was used by the Sierra Club as a visual aid for the environmental movement, and was the first photograph Adams made that was based on feelings, a concept he would come to define as visualization and prompt him to create the Zone System. The image stands as a testament to the intense relationship Adams had with the landscape of Yosemite, as his career was largely marked by photographing the park. Monolith has also physically endured the test of time as the original glass plate negative is still intact and printable. The photograph is a part of the portfolio Parmelian Prints of the High Sierras, released in 1927.

Location
On April 17, 1927, Ansel Adams and his four friends, Cedric Wright, Charles Michael, Arnold Williams, and his girlfriend Virginia Best, set out on a half day hike to the “Diving Board”, the location from which Monolith was taken. The "Diving Board" is a large rock that jets out over the Yosemite Valley, four thousand feet below the western face, providing the perfect view of Half Dome. In his backpack Adams had a  Korona view camera, different lenses and filters, twelve Wratten panchromatic glass plates, and a large wooden tripod. Not only did he have a heavy load, he was also wearing basketball sneakers which struggled to tread on the snowy terrain. When he first arrived at noon, the light was not right so he waited over two hours to make sure the light was hitting the face perfectly, since he envisioned the rock to be half in shadow and half in light.  Adams took multiple other images on the climb and while waiting, and was only left with two glass plates to capture the perfect photo of Half Dome. Given the manual nature of view cameras, it is easy to mess up the aperture or shutter speed, and even a gust of wind can mess up a photograph. This difficulty speaks to Adams’ skill and intentionality as he got the Monolith in one shot. At 2:30 in the afternoon with two glass plates remaining, Adams was ready to take the photograph of Half Dome he had envisioned in his mind.

Development process and technique
To create Monolith, Ansel Adams used a very specific and innovate technique to manipulate the photograph to project the image he had in his mind's eye. Adams was aware of the photographic technique photogenia, which is the practice of intentionally manipulating lighting, exposure, and printing to communicate meaning. With photogenia in mind, he set out to take his first exposure of Half Dome using a K2 Yellow filter. The product was Half Dome with K2 Yellow Filter, 1927, but Adams immediately realized that the contrast would not create a dramatic enough feeling. With the yellow filter, the sky would still be light and there would be minimal tonal contrast. Adams was determined to conjure a photo that expressed the same overwhelming feeling that he felt standing on the “Diving Board” looking up at Half Dome that afternoon. Photographic emulsions are less sensitive to red light, so photos of reds are darker and underexposed. Adams decided to use a deep-red filter to transform the bright sky into a dark black background. The harsh tones and contrast between the white snow and black sky make smaller details more clear, and the eye is immediately drawn to the highlighted elements. Monolith was Adam's first time controlling the viewers experience of his photos and was his first time using photographic principles that are reflected and refined in his later work.

Visualization and the zone system
Monolith prompted Adams to coin the term "visualization". Monolith broke through straight photography and introduced "visualization" as a method in which a photographer knows the way they want the photo to look, and carefully controls aspects of the scene, emulsion, filter, and developmental process to create their exact "envisionment". Adams said, "I see my finished platinum print on the ground glass in all its desired qualities, before my exposure". With the Monolith, visualization was an essential element to its creation. In regards to the photograph, Adams stated, “I began to think about how the print was to appear, and if it would transmit any of the feeling of the monumental shape before me in terms of its expressive-emotional quality. I realized that only a deep red filter would give me anything approaching the effect I felt emotionally." Additionally, The Zone System Adams created a structured way photographers could use dark-room and development techniques to achieve their visualizations. The "Zone System" works to carefully control exposure and development of the negative, and promotes using the dark room and framing techniques to emote a visual experience. Adams created ten different zones to describe a numerical range of the whitest photos to the blackest photos. A photographer can visualize how he wants a print to look, choose the corresponding number in the zone range, then follow subsequent exposing, developing and printing methods to create exact desired tones.

Lasting significance
The lasting significance and display surrounding Monolith is crucial to the development of modern photography, the environmentalist movement, and photography's role in social movements. The distribution and expansion of audience is something that makes Monolith and Ansel Adams work particularly important. He blew up his photographs on photomurals, cards, posters, "coffee-table" books, mediums that are easily accessible to all members of society. Monolith is the cover image for his most published book Yosemite. 

The photograph fell into the United States public domain, meaning it lost its existing copyright status, on January 1, 2023, because it was published in 1927.

Public collections
There are prints, among other visual arts museums, in the Metropolitan Museum of Art, in New York, the Museum of Modern Art in New York, the Museum of Fine Arts, in Boston, and the San Francisco Museum of Modern Art in San Francisco.

References

Bibliography
 Alinder, Mary. “Monolith.” In Ansel Adams: A Biography. New York: Bloomsbury, 2014.
 Hersh, Allison. “America the Beautiful ‘Ansel Adams: Celebration of Genius’ Brings the Prolific Photographer’s Work to Telfair’s Jepson Center for the Arts.” Savannah Morning News (Savannah, GA), Oct. 14, 2007. 
 Frost, James. “Modernism and a New Picturesque: The Environmental Rhetoric of Ansel Adams.” In Technical Communication, Deliberative Rhetoric, and Environmental Discourse: Connections and Directions, edited by Nancy Coppola and Bill Karis. Connecticut: Ablex Publishing Corporation, 2000.

Photographs by Ansel Adams
Photographs of the United States
1927 works
1927 in art
1920s photographs
Works about California
Landscape photographs
Yosemite National Park
Photographs of the Metropolitan Museum of Art
Photographs of the Museum of Modern Art (New York City)
Photographs of the San Francisco Museum of Modern Art